M.A.T.E.R. (Motori Alimentatori Trasformatori Elettrici Roma, often referred to as M.A.T.E.R. Roma) was an Italian association football club located in Rome. It was dissolved in 1945 for lack of funds. Its colors were purple and green.

The club took part in the 1942–43 Serie B season.

Defunct football clubs in Italy
Football clubs in Rome
Association football clubs established in 1933
Association football clubs disestablished in 1945
Serie B clubs
Serie C clubs
1933 establishments in Italy
1945 disestablishments in Italy
Defunct football clubs in Lazio